Joseph Eggleston Segar (June 1, 1804 – April 30, 1880) was a Virginia lawyer, plantation owner and politician who was twice elected as a U.S. Representative from Virginia during the American Civil War, and as a U.S. Senator immediately following the conflict, but whom fellow legislators refused to allow to assume his seat due to Virginia's secession and delayed readmission to the Union.

Early and family life
Born in King William County, Virginia, Segar received a private education appropriate to his class. He studied law.

He married Mary (1808–1886), who would survive him. They had several children, including a son John F. Segar (b. 1836) and a daughter, Virginia Segar (b. 1846) mentioned in the 1850 census. The second Mary Segar was still living with Joseph Segar's household in 1860, as was a young man with middle initial misspelled as Arthur B Segar (born 1843). The latter was actually his nephew, Arthur Simpkins Segar, one of the sons of his slightly younger brother John A. Segar (1805–1848), who had married Charlotte Simpkins in 1832 and moved to Virginia's Eastern Shore, where they had a large family. Joseph Segar accepted his seven-year old nephew into his home in 1851, and paid for his education at two military schools, first the Hampton Academy, then the Danville academy. As the American Civil War began, on May 31, 1861, Arthur S. Segar in Hampton, Virginia enlisted in a Confederate rifle company as a private (the Wythe Rifles incorporated into the 32nd Virginia Infantry according to one source, the nominally Mississippi Hatchie Rifles according to another).  By 1862  with his year-older brother John A. Segar (Jr.) (1843–1918) he joined the 6th Virginia Infantry defending Norfolk. For his efforts in the Seven Days Battles, A.S. Segar received a Virginia lieutenant's commission and with his brother was assigned to the 38th Virginia Infantry.

Career 
Admitted to the bar, Joseph Segar practiced law in various counties in the Hampton Roads area, Elizabeth City County being across Chesapeake Bay from Norfolk, Virginia. Segar held several local offices, and was elected to represent Elizabeth City County and various neighboring counties several times (part time) in the Virginia House of Delegates, 1836–1838, 1848–1853, and 1855-1861.

He also owned slaves, and relatives lived with the family. In 1840, his household included five slaves. In 1850 the household also included two female relatives, Mary Segar (b. 1820) and Sally F. Segar (b. 1843).  By 1860, Segar called himself a farmer rather than lawyer, probably because he operated a plantation in the seaside suburb of Hampton called (for its dunes) Fox Hill (and his son John also called himself a farmer). Segar owned seven slaves in 1860, all but two of them over fifty years old. Although not mentioned in the census forms, Segar actually owned the Hygeia Hotel and most of the land between Fort Monroe and what became the Hampton Institute. When Union troops secured Fort Monroe in May 1861, Massachusetts troops converted the late former President John Tyler's summer home, Villa Margaret, into barracks and Federal troops also encamped on the Segar farm at the Hampton end of a bridge over what was sometimes called Mill Creek or Comfort Creek, for it led near Old Point Comfort. The camp was initially called Camp Troy, but later Camp Hamilton to honor then Lt.Col. Schuyler Hamilton, secretary to Gen. Winfield Scott.

Congressional career
Segar presented credentials as a Unionist Member-elect to the Thirty-seventh Congress from an election held on October 24, 1861, but the House on February 11, 1862, decided he was not entitled to the seat. Segar was subsequently elected to the same Congress and served from March 15, 1862, to March 3, 1863.

In the Thirty-eighth Congress (1863–1865), no Virginia representatives were seated. Segar presented credentials, but was declared not entitled to the seat by resolution of May 17, 1864, though he was paid for mileage and pro-rated salary.

Segar presented credentials on February 17, 1865, as a United States senator-elect to fill the vacancy in the term commencing March 4, 1863, caused by the death of Lemuel J. Bowden, but was not permitted to take his seat. In the first session of the Virginia General Assembly following passage of VIrginia's Constitution of 1869, his nephew Arthur S. Segar was one of Norfolk City's two delegates, alongside Republican Henry M. Bowden.

On January 25, 1870, in the Forty-first Congress, Segar claimed an at-large ninth seat for Virginia in the U.S. House, but was not seated. The recent Virginia constitutional convention had asserted the ninth seat, but Congress only allowed eight seats to Virginia, since its apportionment of eleven seats had been reduced by the three seats assigned to the new state of West Virginia in 1863.

Segar was an unsuccessful Republican candidate for election in 1876 to the Forty-fifth Congress.

Later life
After the Civil War, Segar went bankrupt, as did diehard rebel Jefferson Sinclair, a prominent landowner in Hampton who often cross-signed notes with Segar. Segar attempted to petition the United States government for compensation for the use of his farm during the war, but his requests were largely ignored. “I was immovably loyal to the Union both before and during the rebellion, and still am. I refused to follow my State into the crime of secession” he argued. During the administration of President Rutherford B. Hayes, Segar received an appointment to the Spanish Claims Commission, serving from 1877 to 1880.

Segar died on a steamer while en route from Norfolk, Virginia, to Washington, D.C., on April 30, 1880. He was interred in St. John's Cemetery, Hampton, Virginia, where his widow joined him eight years later. His grateful nephew, A.S. Segar would continue his uncle's legal and political legacy in the Hampton Roads area, becoming a schoolteacher, then a lawyer and Conservative Party politician who represented Norfolk for a single term in the Virginia General Assembly (1869–1870), and later won election as the Commonwealth Attorney for Elizabeth City County and served eight years before resuming his private legal practice representing the Chesapeake and Ohio Railroad and the Newport News Shipyard, among prominent clients.

References

Sources

External links

 

1804 births
1880 deaths
People from King William County, Virginia
Unionist Party members of the United States House of Representatives from Virginia
Virginia Unionists
Republican Party members of the Virginia House of Delegates
Virginia lawyers
19th-century American lawyers
19th-century American politicians
Southern Unionists in the American Civil War
Republican Party members of the United States House of Representatives from Virginia